Telly Addicts was a British television game show that aired on BBC One from 3 September 1985 to 29 July 1998, and hosted by Noel Edmonds. All questions were based on television programmes past and present, and generally took the form of a short clip being shown followed by a series of questions either specifically about the clip or more generally about the programme from which it had been taken. Two teams sat opposite each other on sofas. The final series in 1998 had three teams of two players.

Formats

1985–1986
The original format had two teams of four people with a winner-stays-on format. The challengers had to try to beat the champions to win and return as the champions in the next show, whilst the champions were simply playing to retain their title. This backfired somewhat after a single family, the Payne family, managed to last almost the entire series.

1987–1996
The format changed to a tournament format, (most likely because of the aforementioned single family in the first series).  It involved 16 teams in eight qualifying heats. The eight winning teams of the qualifying heats would go on into the Quarter-Finals; the four winning teams of the Quarter-Finals would go into the Semi-Finals; the two winning teams of the Semi-Finals would proceed to the Grand Final, and the winning team of the Grand Final became the champions. After the main series, it was quite normal for the series winners to return to take part in a special game, usually broadcast over Christmas, where they would go up against a team of celebrities.

1997–1998
There was no series in 1997. The show returned in 1998 with a massive revamp with new rounds and rules. Instead of two teams, there were now three teams of two players and the tournament format was dropped. These changes were first seen in a special Christmas celebrity edition in 1997 before a full series commenced the following year, before finally ending for good on 29 July 1998.

Rounds in the 1998 version
 TV Clip: Each team was given a classic TV clip and had to answer 3 questions related to the clip with one point for each correct answer.
 The Beginners Guide: Someone who worked on a classic TV show (e.g. a writer or actor), was asked what would be the 10 best things that summed up the programme. Each team had 60 seconds to guess as many as they could, scoring a point for each.
 In The Box: A mystery celebrity was concealed inside a multi-coloured box and answering general knowledge TV questions correctly allowed for a small panel to be opened. Each question was worth one point, with three points for managing to correctly guess the mystery celebrity. If a team got the celebrity guess wrong, they were frozen out for the rest of the round. Following the reveal, the celebrity guest would ask a bonus question in return for a small prize, such as a board game. After this round, the team with the fewest points was eliminated.
 The Pyramid: The two remaining teams were shown four categories associated with TV, and each team picked one of them to answer questions about. One player from each team then stood inside a pyramid structure and was asked quickfire questions on their chosen category with one point for each correct answer.
 World TV: Teams were shown a small film documenting the kind of TV shown in a foreign country (e.g. Spain, New Zealand) and then took in turns answering questions on what they saw. One point for a correct answer but incorrect answers saw the question passed onto the opposition.
 Raiders of the Lost Archive: Taking in turns, the teams selected a category from a grid of nine and were asked a question from it, either worth 1, 3 or 5 points. The lowest scoring team after this game was eliminated.
 Stairway of the Stars: The last remaining team were given a series of clues related to a celebrity, by moving onto their name space on the stairway, if they were right, the questions continued but if it was wrong, an alarm sounded and they had to return to the level they were on. The team had 60 seconds to get to the top, if they did, they won a holiday, which had some loose connection to the World TV round but if they failed, they would instead win a widescreen TV each, but they would also have to suffer the indignity of finding out the star prize they missed out on.

Spin offs
The Telly Addicts format was re-used in 2002 for the UK subscription TV channel Challenge in the form of quiz shows Soap Addicts, hosted by Malandra Burrows and Richard Arnold. However, the programme was not recommissioned after its 2003 series. Sport Addicts also existed and was hosted by Bradley Walsh and Celebrity Addicts was hosted by Lisa Rogers and Richard Arnold. Soap Addicts was when teams had to answer questions about famous soaps with clips and pictures. Sport Addicts also followed this but with teams answering questions about sports with clips and pictures and Celebrity Addicts was teams answering questions about celebrities with clips and pictures.

In 2021, Paul Sinha's TV Showdown debuted on ITV, which is described as an updated version of Telly Addicts. The programme licenses the Telly Addicts format from owners Unique Television.

Games
Waddingtons produced two board game editions of "Telly Addicts" in 1989 and 1992 respectively.
Three Interactive DVDs based on the Telly Addicts show have been produced so far, featuring original presenter Noel Edmonds. The first was released in Autumn 2005 , the second in Autumn 2006  and the third in Autumn 2007.

A Telly Addicts video game for Nintendo DS, Nintendo Wii, PSP and PS2 was published by Ubisoft on 9 November 2007.

Transmissions

Series

Specials

International versions
Telly Addicts was adapted twice for the French market. 'Allume la télé!' was an adaptation of the original format. 'Les Cinglés de la télé' was based on the 1998 format.

References

External links
 
 

1980s British game shows
1990s British game shows
1985 British television series debuts
1998 British television series endings
BBC television game shows
English-language television shows
Television series about television